Metropolitan Theatre is a historic theater building located at Morgantown, Monongalia County, West Virginia. It opened July 24, 1924, two-and-a-half years after construction began, and consists of a single floor auditorium with balcony. The building measures 72 feet by 143 feet, and has two storefronts on the ground floor and a pool room in the basement.  The front facade features fluted concrete Ionic order pilasters with egg-and-dart detail in the Classical Revival style.  The theater continues to provide a home for the city's best live entertainment.

It was listed on the National Register of Historic Places in 1984. It is located in the Downtown Morgantown Historic District, listed in 1996.

References

External links

Metropolitan Theatre website
Cinema Treasures: Metropolitan Theatre
West Virginia & Regional History Center at West Virginia University, Metropolitan Threatre, Morgantown, Records
University of West Virginia Libraries, West Virginia History Onview: "Fire at the Metropolitan Theatre, Morgantown, W. Va."

Theatres on the National Register of Historic Places in West Virginia
Neoclassical architecture in West Virginia
Theatres completed in 1924
Buildings and structures in Morgantown, West Virginia
National Register of Historic Places in Monongalia County, West Virginia
Individually listed contributing properties to historic districts on the National Register in West Virginia